Dirk Scott (born 14 September 1955) is a South African cricketer. He played in seventeen first-class and four List A matches for Border from 1978/79 to 1984/85.

See also
 List of Border representative cricketers

References

External links
 

1955 births
Living people
South African cricketers
Border cricketers
Cricketers from Johannesburg